Micromyrtus imbricata is a plant species of the family Myrtaceae endemic to Western Australia.

It and blooms between August and November producing white-pink flowers

It is found on flats along the south coast of the Goldfields-Esperance region of Western Australia from Ravensthorpe to east of Esperance where it grows in sandy soils over granite.

References

imbricata
Flora of Western Australia
Plants described in 1867
Taxa named by George Bentham